The West Bluff Historic District is one of three Registered Historic Districts in the Peoria County, Illinois, city of Peoria. The district is mostly residential and is an example of the opulence once enjoyed by the upper class in the United States during the late 19th and early 20th centuries. Of particular note are two contributing structures designed by Frank Lloyd Wright: Francis W. Little House at 1505 W. Moss Ave., and the house at 1316 W. Moss Ave.  Other NRHP properties also listed as contributing to this district include the Judge Jacob Gale House at 1007 N. North St. and Pettingill-Morron House at 1212 W. Moss Ave.  The district was added to the National Register of Historic Places on December 17, 1976.

Boundaries
The district boundaries are roughly defined by Randolph, Moss and High Streets, an area west of Western Avenue. In addition, some of the adjacent streets are included in the historic district.

Notes

Peoria, Illinois
National Register of Historic Places in Peoria County, Illinois
Houses on the National Register of Historic Places in Illinois
Houses in Peoria County, Illinois
Historic districts on the National Register of Historic Places in Illinois